The Neagra Broștenilor (also: Neagra) is a right tributary of the river Bistrița in Romania. It discharges into the Bistrița in the village Neagra, near Broșteni.

References

Rivers of Romania
Rivers of Harghita County
Rivers of Suceava County